To Strangers and Friends is the title of the fifth solo album by the British singer-songwriter John Pantry.

Track listing

Side one
 "Don't be Careless" (John Pantry)
 "Don't Touch" (John Pantry)
 "I Want to be Like You" (John Pantry)
 "Runours" (John Pantry)
 "Loneliness" (John Pantry)

Side two
 "A Change of Heart" (John Pantry)
 "Blame it on the One I Love" (Kelly Willard)
 "Going Over Old Ground" (John Pantry)
 "I Belong to You" (John Pantry)
 "Awake" (John Pantry)

Personnel
John Pantry: Vocals and Keyboards
Tim Harries: Bass
Phil Gould: Drums
Chris Norton: Keyboards
Victor Lewis Smith: Keyboards and Saxophone
Norman Barratt: Guitar
John McLoughlin: Guitar
Mo Witham: Guitar
Rob McKay: Saxophone
Bruce Nockles: Trumpet
Andrew MAries: Oboe
London Festival Ballet: Strings

Production notes
Produced by John Pantry and Nick Ryan
Mastered by Dave Aston
Arranged by Chris Norton
Recorded at ICC Studios, Eastbourne, East Sussex

References

1980 albums